Joseph Claudius Ignace deLoyo Léger (September 9, 1920 – September 4, 2014) was a Canadian politician. He served in the Legislative Assembly of New Brunswick as member of the Liberal party from 1948 to 1952.

References

1920 births
2014 deaths
20th-century Canadian politicians
20th-century Canadian lawyers
Judges in New Brunswick
New Brunswick Liberal Association MLAs
Politicians from Saint John, New Brunswick
Canadian King's Counsel